"Satisfy My Soul" is a song by Bob Marley and the Wailers, it was originally recorded in 1970 as "Don't Rock My Boat" before being re-recorded in 1977 and then released in 1978 as a single for their album Kaya being released that year. It peaked at number 21 in the UK charts upon its release. The song became one of the most well-known Marley songs and was included on the Legend compilation.

Music video
A music video for the song was uploaded in YouTube on April 24, 2019.

Charts

Reference

1977 songs
1978 singles
Bob Marley songs